Lucie Prost (2 April 1905 – 28 June 1970) was a French fencer. She competed in the individual women's foil competition at the 1924 and 1928 Summer Olympics.

References

External links
 

1905 births
1970 deaths
French female foil fencers
Olympic fencers of France
Fencers at the 1924 Summer Olympics
Fencers at the 1928 Summer Olympics
20th-century French women